Dwight C. Wise, Jr. (September 27, 1930 – December 22, 2020) was an American politician and farmer from Ohio.

Wise served in the Ohio House of Representatives. He was in office from 1983 until December 1994, being defeated by Rex Damschroder.

References

Democratic Party members of the Ohio House of Representatives
1930 births
2020 deaths